Dhalla is a small town of Rawalpindi District in the Punjab province of Pakistan. It has 260 houses. It is located in Northern Punjab at 33°25'36N 72°57'25E with an altitude of 434 metres (1423 ft) and lies south of the district capital, Rawalpindi. The latest consolidation operation was held in 1986. Descendants of those that held leadership positions during the Sikh Empire and British Raj continue to use the awarded Dhalla title and some families have even adopted Dhalla as a surname.

History
Before the independence of Pakistan in 1947, Dhalla was mostly populated by Sikhs. Following the 1947 partition, Sikhs migrated back to India peacefully along with their brotherhood. Majority of Sikhs from Dhalla have migrated to Jalandhar, India and Patiala, India since the Pakistani partition.

There are some remains of man-made caves in the hills of Dhalla that used to provide shelter from the rain for herds and farmers. The caves were broken down for construction purposes, so the last remembrance of Sikhs vanished around the 2000s. Prior to the Sikh Government in Dhalla, it was a famous state of Pakhral Rajput and they ruled between Dhalla to Chantal.

Location and geography
Dhalla is located on a hill on Adiala Road.

Surrounding
Dhalla has 2 dams in its surrounding areas, Jawa Dam and Khasala Dam in the village before Dhalla. The river Sawan is passing in front of the village. The bed of Sawan river is very fertile and full of greenery which have an outstanding look from the top of the village. The temperature in winter may decrease to 1 c and in June may rise up to 55 c. Mostly people are farmers and make their income from farming but the new generation know is moving towards industrial and government departments.

Education
There are a number of government educational institutions being developed in the town, such as
 Govt. High School Dhalla for boys.
 Govt. Primary School Dhalla for boys.
 Govt. Girls High School Dhalla for girls.
Students from nearby villages come and study in these schools. Some private English Medium schools are also there in the town.

Health
There is a government hospital in the town with several beds spaces. It is an old hospital before the independence. Its building structure was old style recently new building constructed on the same place. One family welfare center is available and one private clinic is also in the town, people from nearby villages come and get treatment and medicine for small diseases and injuries  from the hospital and clinic.

Telecommunication
The PTCL provides the main network of landline telephone. Many ISPs and all major mobile phone and wireless companies operating in Pakistan provide service in Dhalla.

Religion
There are five mosques in the town Jamia Mosque, Farooq'e Azam Mosque and Bilal Mosque. One under construction Madrasa Hanfia Farooqia is also in the town for Islamic education and memorizing the Quran. There is an accommodation for student of Madrasa. This runs with the help of locals and charities. Approximately 99% population of the town is Sunni Muslims.

Agriculture
Dhalla is an agricultural town in this area. People harvest the vegetables and Approximately 80% population is attached with this field. A significant proportion of the population belong to the Minhas rajpoot (Pakhraal),Awan and khengar tribe and their lives and source of income totally depend on their agricultural land of the Sawan river bed which consist of very fertile soil of Sawan river. The people of Dhalla also use the water of jawa dam for cultivation

Water reservoir
Jawa Dam is a small water reservoir. It located Dhungi Reserved Forest.
This dam was designed to irrigate 800 acres of land with irrigation requirement of 0.783 MCM at cropping intensity of 100%. Jawa dam became operational in 1997. Since its inception, the dam received almost constant inflow till 2000. However, after 2000, the inflow decreased gradually most probably due to decrease in rainfall. Except for the year 1998 and 2002, the outflow has been less than the inflow. Because this dam is built on a perennial stream, it received regular and constant flow throughout the year. However, the flow is relatively high in June to August, due to monsoon. The total average annual inflow to dam is 0.687 MCM, whereas, outflow is 0.777 MCM. In this case the discharge is more than the inflow. However, the available irrigation supply from the dam is almost equal the designed irrigation requirement of 0.783 MCM. Therefore, in general, the available water is sufficient to irrigate the designed area. But unfortunately the dam serves very less to the land of Dhalla although the dam is situated at the land of Dhalla.

References

Towns in Rawalpindi District
Populated places in Rawalpindi Tehsil